The Onega Canal is a canal that runs along the southern banks of Lake Onega in Vytegorsky District of Vologda Oblast and Podporozhsky District of Leningrad Oblasts in Russia. It was built 1818–1820 and 1845–1852 as a part of Mariinsk Canal System, to allow small riverboats to avoid Lake Onega, where storms are frequent and where many boats had perished through the centuries. At the mouth of the canal, in the selo of Voznesenye, a memorial obelisk has been erected. 

The canal lost its significance after Mariinsk Canal System was reconstructed and became Volga-Baltic Waterway. Onezhsky Canal was not reconstructed and became too shallow for larger boats. It is still navigable, but not used for regular navigation.

Two rivers, Vozheroksa and Oshta, tributaries of Lake Onega, cross the canal.  from the Vytegra, the canal crosses Lake Megrskoye, a large freshwater lake. There is weak current in the canal in the direction of the Svir.

References

Canals in Russia
Buildings and structures in Vologda Oblast
Buildings and structures in Leningrad Oblast
Transport in Leningrad Oblast
Canals opened in 1852
1852 establishments in the Russian Empire
Transport in Vologda Oblast